These are the squads for the 2017 Women's Cricket World Cup. The captains of each team were announced on 21 April 2017.

Key

Australia

England

India

New Zealand

Pakistan

Bismah Maroof injured her hand during Pakistan's match against England and was ruled out of the rest of the tournament. She was replaced by Iram Javed.

South Africa

Andrie Steyn was injured in a training session and was replaced by Odine Kirsten.

Sri Lanka

West Indies

Both Shakera Selman and Shamilia Connell suffered injuries and were replaced by Subrina Munroe and Kycia Knight.

References

Women's Cricket World Cup squads
squads